Toya is the self-titled debut studio album by American R&B singer Toya. It was released by Arista Records on August 7, 2001. Musically, the album is a R&B album that incorporates hip hop soul elements. Toya peaked at number 109 on the US Billboard 200. It remains Toya's only studio release.

Critical reception

Toya received positive reviews. Stephen Thomas Erlewine of Allmusic noted the album's "savvy combination of classic soul conventions, innovative production, strong songwriting, and fine, understated singing," and called the album "not just a fine debut, but one of the best urban records of 2001."

Commercial performance
Toya peaked at 109 on the US Billboard 200, reaching sixty on the Top R&B/Hip-Hop Albums.

Track listing

Personnel
Information taken from Allmusic
Co-production – Harold Guy, Kelli Justice, Toya
Mixing – Charles "Prince Charles" Alexander, Tim Olmstead
Performer(s) – Loon, Murphy Lee, The Penelopes, T.I.
Production – Allstar, Bam, Bless, Ryan Bowser, Copenhaniacs, Dallas Awesome, David Frank, Ramahn "Jer-Z" Herbert, K-Mack, Clemont Mack, Multiman, Soulshock & Karlin

Charts

References

External links
 
 Toya at Discogs

2001 debut albums
Albums produced by Dallas Austin
Arista Records albums
Toya (singer) albums